Numerous plants have been introduced to Hawaii, and many of them have become invasive species.

Invasive plants 
The following are some of invasive plant species established in Hawaii:

Ageratina riparia
Andropogon glomeratus
Andropogon virginicus
Argyreia nervosa
Carduus pycnocephalus
Casuarina
Cenchrus ciliaris
Christella dentata
Chrysophyllum oliviforme
Cinchona pubescens
Clusia rosea
Cortaderia selloana
Cotoneaster pannosus
Cyathea cooperi
Cynodon dactylon
Erica lusitanica
Eucalyptus globulus
Ficus microcarpa
Hedychium gardnerianum
Hyparrhenia hirta
Hypericum canariense
Ilex aquifolium
Ipomoea cairica
Ipomoea indica
Lantana montevidensis
Lonicera japonica
Lygodium microphyllum
Miconia calvescens
Muhlenbergia mexicana
Passiflora tarminiana
Psidium cattleianum
Rhizophora mangle
Rubus armeniacus
Rubus ellipticus
Schinus terebinthifolius
Sporobolus indicus
Sporobolus virginicus
Typha latifolia
Verbena bonariensis

Naturalized trees

The following are some of the naturalized trees and shrubs of Hawaii:

Acacia confusa
Acacia mearnsii
Albizia saman
Aleurites moluccanus
Breadfruit
Calophyllum inophyllum
Casuarina equisetifolia
Casuarina glauca
Ceratonia siliqua
Eucalyptus globulus
Albizia - Falcataria moluccana
Ficus microcarpa
Grevillea robusta
Heliotropium foertherianum
Leucaena leucocephala
Melastoma sanguineum
Melastoma septemnervium
Metrosideros kermadecensis
Miconia calvescens
Morinda citrifolia
Myrica faya
Paper mulberry
Prosopis pallida
Psidium cattleianum
Psidium guajava
Schefflera actinophylla
Schinus terebinthifolius
Spathodea
Syzygium jambos
Terminalia catappa
Trema orientalis

See also
Invasive species in the United States

External links
USDA PLANTS Database USDA database showing county distribution of plant species in the US
InvasiveSpecies.gov Information from the US National Invasive Species Council

Invasive plants
invasive plant species
Hawaii
Hawaii
i